Mock is an imitation, usually of lesser quality

Mock may refer to:

Names
Mock (surname)
Mock, or Duncan Stump, a member of the band Mock & Toof
Mock, a character in the Japanese anime series Mock & Sweet

Places
Mock, Washington, a ghost town

Imitations
Mockery, imitation to express ridiculing derision
Mock object, a programming object that mimics the behavior of real objects in controlled ways
Mock trial, an act or imitation trial

See also

Mock - 1, a 1998 album by Mocking Shadows
"Mock", a 2015 song by The Story So Far from The Story So Far
Mock the Week, a British topical comedy panel show broadcast on BBC Two

Synonyms
Fake (disambiguation)
Imaginary (disambiguation)
Insult
Parody
Pretending (disambiguation)
Simulation

Derived terms
Mockup
Mocker (disambiguation)
Mock orange (disambiguation)
Mockery (disambiguation)
Mock olive

Possible misspellings
Mack (disambiguation)
Meck (disambiguation)
Mick (disambiguation)
Moc (disambiguation)
Muck (disambiguation)

Everything else